Vechec is a village and municipality in Vranov nad Topľou District in the Prešov Region of eastern Slovakia.

History
In historical records the village was first mentioned in 1402.

Geography
The municipality lies at an altitude of 184 metres and covers an area of 17.271 km². It has a population of about 2331 people.

External links
 
 
 http://www.statistics.sk/mosmis/eng/run.html

Villages and municipalities in Vranov nad Topľou District